"Ghetto Love" is a 2011 single by Canadian artist Karl Wolf from his 2012 album Finally Free. The single released in May 2011 features Canadian artist Kardinal Offishall with downloads made available on May 17, 2011.

The song co-produced with UnderGround Procedures (UGP) also mentioned in the introductory part of the song, samples in its refrain on the Peter Cetera song "Glory of Love". However "Ghetto Love" is a separate song rather than a cover version of "Glory of Love" because of its added rap lyrics. Most notably Karl Wolf changes the original "we did it all for the glory of love" to "we did it all for this ghetto ghetto love" and in addition, "I am a man" is replaced by "I am the man."  A French version also exists, but retains the English-language chorus.

Track list
Ghetto Love (feat. Kardinal Offishall) (3:04)
Ghetto Love (No Rap version) (3:05)

Music video
The music video for the release was by Director X and it was filmed in Jamaica.

Charts

References

2011 singles
Karl Wolf songs
Kardinal Offishall songs
Songs written by David Foster
Songs written by Kardinal Offishall
Songs written by Peter Cetera